This is a list of the 2019 Professional Darts Corporation calendar of events with player progression documented from the quarterfinals stage where applicable.

The list includes European tour events, Players Championships events, World Series of Darts events and PDC majors. This list includes some regional tours, such as the ones in Nordic, Baltic and Oceanic regions, but does not include British Darts Organisation (BDO) events.

January

February

March

April

May

June

July

August

September

October

November

December

See also
List of players with a 2019 PDC Tour Card
2019 PDC Pro Tour

References

External links
Professional Darts Corporation Ltd. – official website

Professional Darts Corporation
2019 in darts